Tabon M. Estrella National High School (TMENHS) is a public, technical-vocational high school institution located in Purok 4A, Sugala Street, Waray-Waray, Barangay Tabon, Bislig, Surigao del Sur, Philippines.

External links
Tabon Maximino Estrella National High School website

Schools in Surigao del Sur
Education in Bislig
Educational institutions established in 1981
High schools in the Philippines